Belarusian Catholic Church may refer to:

 Catholic Church in Belarus, incorporating all communities and institutions of the Catholic Church in Belarus
 Belarusian Byzantine Catholic Church, an Eastern Catholic church of the Byzantine Rite, centered in Belarus

See also 
 Belarusian Church (disambiguation)
 Belarusian Orthodox Church
 Albanian Catholic Church
 Bulgarian Catholic Church
 Croatian Catholic Church
 Greek Catholic Church
 Hungarian Catholic Church
 Romanian Catholic Church
 Russian Catholic Church
 Serbian Catholic Church
 Slovak Catholic Church
 Ukrainian Catholic Church